The Fighting Cocks is a Grade II listed public house in Moseley, Birmingham, England.

History
The public house by this name in Moseley was first recorded in 1759, when on Boxing Day, a cock-fighting event took place between gentlemen from Warwickshire and Worcestershire.

The earlier public house was demolished when King Edward Road was formed off Alcester Road. This building was erected in 1903 to the designs of the architects Thomas Walter Francis Newton and Alfred Edward Cheatle. It was built in the Arts and Crafts style.

References

Moseley
1903 establishments in England
Grade II listed pubs in Birmingham